Azmeh Miran (also Romanized as Azmeh Mīrān; also known as Azmīrān) is a village in Qalkhani Rural District, Gahvareh District, Dalahu County, Kermanshah Province, Iran. At the 2006 census, its population was 609, in 119 families.

References 

Populated places in Dalahu County